NIE or Nie may refer to:
Nie (surname), Chinese surname
NIE (magazine), a Polish weekly magazine
NIE (resistance) (short for Niepodległość), the Polish anti-communist resistance movement in 1940s
NIE number, the national tax identification number for foreigners in Spain

It is an acronym for:

Napoleon in Europe, historical board game
National Institute of Education, school in Singapore that provides professional training for teachers
National Institute of Electronics (Pakistan), Pakistani research institution
National Institute of Engineering, a college in Karnataka, India, now NIE University
National Intelligence Estimate, a type of report by the United States Intelligence Community
Network Integration Evaluation
New institutional economics
Newly industrializing economy
Newspapers in Education, a program encouraging the use of newspapers in the classroom as a teaching tool of essential academic and life skills
Newton's Institute of Engineering, Macherla, school in Andhra Pradesh, India
Northern Ireland Electricity
Northern Ireland Executive, devolved administration in Northern Ireland